The Type 039 submarine (NATO reporting name: Song-class) is a class of diesel-electric submarines of the People's Liberation Army Navy. The class is the first diesel-electric submarine to be fully developed within China and also the first Chinese diesel-electric submarine to use the teardrop hull shape.

Design
The submarine uses a modern teardrop-shape hull for underwater performance.  The hull incorporates four rudders and is propelled by a single propeller. The engine is imported from Germany. For quieter operation, the engine was mounted with shock absorbers and the hull is plated in rubber tiles for sound deadening. Development was not without problems, as a lengthy testing period for the first vessel (320) attests. Problems with noise levels and underwater performance led to revisions in the design and only a single boat was ever built to the original specification.

Improvements led to the specification for the Type 039G, which became the bulk of production, with seven of the type entering service. Elimination of the stepped design for the conning tower is the primary visual cue for identification of the G variant. This class has two versions: the original Type 039, Type 039G. The most obvious visual difference between the two types is the conning tower. The Type 039s conning tower is stepped, rising aft. In an effort to shrink the submarine's acoustic signature, the Type 039Gs conning tower was given a more conventional shape without any step.

Weapons
Primary weapon for the Type 039 is the 533 mm Yu-4 torpedo, a locally produced passive homing  torpedo based on the SAET-50 and roughly comparable to the SAET-60.  Surface targets may be attacked at up to 15 km.  Yu-6 wire-guided torpedoes may also be used for targeting submarines.  It is also likely that the Type 039 is capable of carrying the YJ-8 anti-ship missile, a cruise missile which can be launched from the same tube as the boat's torpedoes, and can target surface vessels at up to 80 km.  The missile is subsonic and carries a 165 kg warhead.  For mining operations, in place of torpedoes, the submarine can carry 24 to 36 naval mines, deliverable through the torpedo tubes.  The general designer of the torpedo and missile launching system is Mr. Sun Zhuguo (孙柱国, 1937-), and the launching system is compatible with AShM, ASW, torpedoes of both China and Russian/Soviet origin.

The CY-1 ASW missile has a maximum range of 18 km (10 nm).

Sensors
The main sensor is the medium-frequency sonar mounted in the bow of the submarine, with passive and active modes, which is used for both search and attack.  In addition, the system offers a method of underwater communications, and also functions as a torpedo approach warning system. This sonar is the Chinese development of French Thomson-CSF TSM-2233 sonar, and is capable of simultaneously tracking 4 to 12 targets depending on the function it is used for.  To enhance passive search capabilities, a low frequency sonar of French Thomson-CSF TSM-2255 design is mounted on the flanks of the hull, with a maximum range in excess of 30 km and capable of simultaneously tracking four targets. The system is further enhanced with the integration of a domestic Chinese passive ranging sonar on board, designated as H/SQG-04 sonar.  For surface search, a small I-band radar is fitted.

This class is the first Chinese submarine to be fitted with an integrated electronic support measures / radio direction finder / radar warning receiver system designated as SRW209 Submarine Radar Reconnaissance Equipment, which works at S - Ku bands with 100% detection rate.  The SRW209 is fully automatic and can be either operated by a single operator with a console with a color CRT (which can be replaced by LCD) display console, or linked to the combat data system, which is capable of tracking multiple targets.

Notable incidents
On October 26, 2006, a Chinese Song class submarine "popped up" and "surfaced within firing range of its torpedoes and missiles before being detected" within  of the carrier  while she was operating in the East China Sea between Japan and Taiwan. It was spotted by an F/A-18C aviator and confirmed by the crew of an EA-6B from the Kitty Hawks Air Wing.

Export potential
 - China offered the 039 submarine for sale to Thailand in 2007. However, the Royal Thai Navy lacks the infrastructure to support submarine this time. Thailand later ordered S26T submarine, an export version of the Type 039A .

See also
People's Liberation Army Navy Submarine Force
 List of submarine classes in service
 Hai Lung-class submarine
 Harushio-class submarine
 Dolphin-class submarine
 Walrus-class submarine
 Upholder/Victoria-class submarine
 Collins-class submarine
 Lada-class submarine
 S-80-class submarine

References

External links
Type 039 Song Class Diesel-Electric Submarines at sinodefense.com

Submarine classes